Manjack may refer to:

Manjack language, the language of the Manjacks
Manjack people, an ethnic group in Guinea-Bissau and Senegal
Pink manjack (Tabebuia heterophylla), a tree of the Caribbean islands
A number of Cordia species of shrubs and trees
Manjack, a town in Montserrat
Manjack Cay, one of the Abaco Islands in the Bahamas

See also
Man Jack, an every-man in the phrase "every man Jack"
Manjak (disambiguation)